The División del Norte was an armed faction formed by Francisco I. Madero and initially led by General José González Salas following Madero's call to arms  at the outbreak of the Mexican Revolution in 1910. González Salas served in Francisco I. Madero's cabinet as Minister of War, but at the outbreak of the 1912 rebellion by Pascual Orozco, González Salas organized 6,000 troops of the Federal Army at Torreón.  Orozquista forces surprised González Salas at the First Battle of Rellano. They sent an explosives packed train hurtling toward the Federales, killing at least 60 and injuring González Salas. Mutinous troops killed one of his commanders and after seeing the officer's body, González Salas committed suicide.

The leadership of the division was then assigned to General Victoriano Huerta, who reorganized González Salas's remaining forces that had been defeated by Oroquistas.

After Madero's overthrow in the counter-revolutionary coup that culminated the la Decena trágica, Pancho Villa assumed the leadership of the revolutionary northern division. As a result, the Division became closely associated with his name. Villa himself often led his División del Norte into battle.

The División del Norte was in effect a total army rather than a regular division. Villa's troops were assigned military ranks, outfitted with hospital trains and horse ambulances (called Servicio sanitario and said to be the first employed in Mexico), used the railroads built during the Díaz administration to move quickly from one engagement to the other, and unlike some other revolutionary groups, were well equipped with machine guns and even an artillery unit (captured from the Mexican Federal Army and Rurales).

Villa attempted to supply a horse to each infantryman, rather than only his cavalry detachments (Los dorados) in order to increase the speed of movement of his army, thus creating an early version of mobile infantry, or a late version of dragoons. Numerous foreign mercenaries served in the Falange extranjero (foreign legion) of the División, including such notables as Ivor Thord-Gray and the grandson of Giuseppe Garibaldi.

Villa excluded women soldaderas from the División del Norte.  U.S. American journalist John Reed spent time with Villa and the División del Norte, writing in his book about the Mexican Revolution Insurgent Mexico that "Up to [Villa's] day, Mexican armies had always carried with them hundreds of the women and children of soldiers; Villa was the first man to think of swift forced marches of bodies of cavalry, leaving their women behind."

The División del Norte at its height numbered some 50,000 men. This was the largest revolutionary force ever amassed in the Americas. Pancho Villa's notoriety no doubt played an important part to recruiting such large numbers of men. Despite having such numerical advantage, the División del Norte was defeated at the Battle of Celaya on April 1915 by forces of Álvaro Obregón. The outcome of the battle came to the favor of Obregón who used  defensive tactics from current European battle reports of World War I. The División del Norte with its cavalry charges was no match for well placed barbed wire, trenches, artillery and machine gun nests.

In 1980, the Mexico City metro opened the Metro División del Norte station on Line 3. There is a nearby Avenida División del Norte. The logo for the metro station is a stylized version of Villa, but not his name.

See also
Juan Bautista Vargas Arreola

Further reading
 The Course of Mexican History: Seventh Edition Michael Meyer
 *René De La Pedraja Tomán, "Wars of Latin America, 1899-1941", McFarland, 2006, .
 Frank McLynn, "Villa and Zapata. A History of the Mexican Revolution", Basic Books, 2000, .

References

Factions of the Mexican Revolution